Onthophagus ceylonicus, is a species of dung beetle found in India and Sri Lanka.

Description
This broadly oval, less convex species has an average length of about 7 to 8.5 mm. Male is smaller than female. Body testaceous yellow and shiny. Head, pronotum, longitudinal stripes on elytra are dark chocolate-brown in color. Basal part of the pygidium and ventrum of the body also dark. Body covered with scanty clothing of pale yellow setae. Head broad and pronotum very smooth, with scattered fine punctures. Elytra very strongly striate, closely punctured, with convex intervals. Pygidium with few minute punctures. Metasternum extremely smooth, with a few large lateral punctures. Male has very smooth head with a very few punctures, clypeus not separated from the forehead. Pronotum possess a minute tubercle laterally. Female has little produced clypeus, which is bluntly bilobed. Pronotum is evenly convex.

References 

Scarabaeinae
Beetles of Sri Lanka
Insects described in 1859